FK Sloga Temerin is a football club from Temerin, Serbia.

History
The club was founded in 1928.  It has been competing in the Vojvodina League South continuously since 2017.

References

External links
 FK Sloga Temerin at srbijasport.net

Football clubs in Serbia
Football clubs in Vojvodina
Association football clubs established in 1928
1928 establishments in Serbia